Tyttocharax madeirae, the blackedge tetra, also known as the bristly-mouthed tetra or the blue tetra, is a small freshwater fish of the family Characidae found in the Amazon basin of South America. It was first caught by Edgar A. Smith in 1912 in Brazil and described by American ichthyologist Henry Weed Fowler in 1913.

Unlike many other charcharins, T. madeirae has seen little inclusion into the aquarium trade.

Discovery and naming 

Along with other descriptions made by Fowler in 1913,  eight specimens of T. madeirae, including the holotype and the paratype, were collected by Edgar A. Smith during a 1912-1913 expedition to the Amazon basin in Brazil along the Madeira River.

In his description, Fowler named the species for the Madeira River.

Distribution 
Tyttocharax madeirae has been found in the lower and middle tributaries of the Amazon basin, being found in the nations of Brazil, Bolivia, and Peru. It is pelagic, and according to observations by Herbert R. Axelrod were found in shallow waters 0.3 to 0.6 meters deep (1 to 2 feet) at most.

In a sampling expedition by Barros et al., T. madeirae accounted for 0.82% of the total 5508 collected specimens and occurred in 13.6% of the sampled streams of the Madeira-Purus interfluvial plain.

Description 
Fowler did not describe the colors of a living T. madeirae, however, it was described as palish brown when in alcohol, exhibiting countershading with a paler underside. T. madeirae is considered small, with the average length of the species being 1.5 cm (0.59 inches) and ranging from 1.1 to 1.8 cm (0.43 to 0.71 inches).

Ecology
Tyttocharax madeirae is an invertivore, specializing on aquatic invertebrates while also occasionally preying on terrestrial vertebrates which may fall into the water.

References 

Characidae
Tetras
Taxa named by Henry Weed Fowler
Fish described in 1913